Treehorn's Treasure is a book by Florence Parry Heide, illustrated by Edward Gorey and first published in 1981.  It belongs to the same series as The Shrinking of Treehorn (1971).  In Treehorn's Treasure, the main character Treehorn discovers that money does in fact grow on trees – his tree!

This book was followed by Treehorn's Wish.

1981 children's books
Children's fiction books
American picture books